Tanea Brooks (born September 8, 1978), better known by the ring name Rebel, is an American professional wrestler, professional wrestling manager, model, actress, dancer, and cosmetologist signed to All Elite Wrestling. She is also known for her work in Impact Wrestling.

Early life
Tanea Brooks was born and raised in Owasso, Oklahoma. Brooks became a Dallas Cowboys Cheerleader at age 18, after a year as a University of Tulsa dance team member. Brooks also appeared on the cover of the Cheerleaders’ swimsuit calendar. Brooks is a longtime friend of wrestling industry veteran Christy Hemme: before either worked in wrestling, Brooks worked in Hemme's "Purrfect Angelz" burlesque dance troupe. Tanea eventually moved to Los Angeles to further her careers in acting, modeling and dancing. Brooks attended the Napoleon Perdis Makeup academy, where she became a licensed cosmetologist. Brooks also played in the Lingerie Football League, on its New York Euphoria team.

Professional wrestling career

Total Nonstop Action Wrestling/Impact Wrestling (2013–2016) 

Brooks was signed to Total Nonstop Action Wrestling in 2013 after long-time friend and former "Purrfect Angelz" member Christy Hemme recommended her. In May 2014, she began appearing as Rebel, a childhood friend and partner of Knux in a carny-themed stable called The Menagerie, also including Crazzy Steve and The Freak. Rebel made her in-ring debut on the September 10 episode of Impact Wrestling, teaming with Crazzy Steve and Knux in six person mixed tag-team match, where they lost to the team of The BroMans (Robbie E and Jessie Godderz) and Velvet Sky. The following episode of Impact Wrestling during a Knockouts battle royal, Rebel legitimately fractured her arm when she landed on the steel steps when Havok knocked her over the top rope. She made her in-ring return on the October 15 episode of Impact Wrestling, defeating Angelina Love and The BroMans. On the following episode, Rebel was scheduled to face Angelina Love in her singles debut on Impact Wrestling, however she was met by Havok who maliciously attacked her. On January 7, 2015, during Impact Wrestlings debut on Destination America, Rebel participated in a battle royal for the TNA Knockouts Championship, however she was the first to be eliminated. After some hiatus, The Menagerie's profile on the TNA website was later moved to the alumni section.

In her first match since The Menagerie split, Rebel teamed with Brooke in a losing effort to The Dollhouse (Jade and Marti Bell) in a tag team match on the May 15 episode of Impact Wrestling. A few weeks later, Rebel was seen in a backstage segment, congratulating Brooke on her winning the TNA Knockouts Championship, only to be attacked by Jade and Marti Bell. On the August 26 episode of Impact Wrestling, Rebel turned heel for the first time in TNA by attacking Velvet Sky and aligning with The Dollhouse. On January 5, 2016, during Impact Wrestlings debut on POP, Awesome Kong allied with Rebel, Jade and Marti Bell and became the new leader of The Dollhouse after she attacked The Beautiful People (Velvet Sky and Madison Rayne) and Gail Kim. In March 2016, The Dollhouse officially disbanded following Jade's Knockouts Championship reign. On September 14, 2016, Rebel announced her departure from TNA.

Ohio Valley Wrestling (2014–2017)
In 2014, Brooks began training at Ohio Valley Wrestling. In July, Rebel began competing in OVW dark matches, where she defeated former two-time OVW Women's Champion Jessie Belle, and defeated Mary Elizabeth Monroe on two occasions. Rebel made her televised debut at the Saturday Night Special on August 2, where she once again defeated Monroe. On October 1, Rebel defeated Jessie Belle to become the number one contender for the OVW Women's Championship; however, the match was cut from broadcast as a result of OVW ceasing with women's wrestling at the time.

When OVW was sold to Dean Hill, Rebel returned as the mystery opponent for Jessie Belle on July 11, 2015, on OVW Episode 829, which she won. On July 20 on OVW Episode 830, Rebel was pinned in a triple-threat match by Jessie Belle, which included Ray Lyn. She lost to Jessie Belle the following week in a singles match. On the August 15 edition of OVW Episode 834, Rebel defeated the returning Mary Elizabeth Monroe, however she was attacked by Jessie Belle after the match. On September 3, 2016, OVW Saturday Night Special, Rebel and Paredyse defeated Jessie Belle Smothers and Shane Andrews, then on September 10 Rebel lost a #1 contender's match for the women's title against Jessie Belle.

On November 2, 2016, on OVW Episode 898 Rebel won the OVW Women's Championship, and successfully defended it 1 week later against Callie. On November 16, 2016, Rebel retained the title against ODB. On March 22 Rebel lost the OVW Women's Championship to Madi Maxx.

Return to Impact Wrestling (2017, 2018)
 
On March 2, 2017, during the tapings of the episode of Impact Wrestling, Rebel returned to TNA in Knockouts Knockdown 2017, in a losing effort against ODB.
On April 6, 2017, during the episode of Impact Wrestling, Rebel participated in a gauntlet match to become number one contender for Rosemary's Knockouts Championship, which she lost. Rebel would return one night only on the July 6, 2017 episode of Impact Wrestling where Rebel lost to Sienna. Another return was made on the June 14, 2018 episode of Impact Wrestling this time losing to Taya Valkyrie. Rebel returned again on the July 5, 2018 episode of Impact Wrestling losing to Katarina.

World Wonder Ring Stardom (2017–2018)
On April 30, 2017, Rebel made her Japanese debut, performing for one of the world's elite women's wrestling companies: World Wonder Ring Stardom. During her 8-week tour of Japan, Brooks worked with some of the most respected women wrestlers in the world. For instance, Brooks' first Stardom match was in its 2017 Cinderella Tournament, against eventual tournament winner and Stardom world champion, Toni Storm. on May 3, Rebel, Jessicka Havok and Tessa Blanchard defeated Hiroyo Matsumoto, Jungle Kyona and Natsuko Tora. on May 6, Rebel and Hiroyo Matsumoto defeated Hetzza and Kaori Yoneyama. on May 7, Rebel lost a 3-way match to Hana Kimura, a rising young star in the company. on May 14, Rebel lost another 3-way match, this time to HZK, another young star and future Stardom world champion. on May 20, Rebel lost another 3-way match to Kimura. on May 21, Rebel lost to Io Shirai, arguably the world's best woman wrestler at the time, and a record-setting holder of multiple Stardom titles. on June 4 Rebel lost again to Kimura. on June 11, Rebel and Shanna defeated Hiromi Mimura and Konami. on June 17, Rebel lost another 3-way match to Kimura. on June 21, Rebel and Team Jungle (Kaori Yoneyama and Natsuko Tora) lost a six-woman tag team match to Hiromi Mimura, Konami and Yoko Bito.

Return to OVW (2017–2019)
Rebel returned to OVW on the August 5, 2017 on OVW Saturday Night Special - War Zone, Rebel competed in a fatal-four way steel cage match against Cali, Mickie Knuckles and Paredyse, which was won by Cali. In November 2018, Rebel injured Indian Actress Rakhi Sawant by grabbing her in inverse position, circulating her, and throwing her on her back. It injured Sawant's back and she fell unconscious, and was later carried to a nearby hospital. On September 23 at the OVW Matt Cappotelli Benefit Show, she defeated Cali, Jaylee and Torey Payne in a fatal-four-way match.

On August 4, 2018, at OVW Saturday Night Special , Rebel unsuccessfully challenged Jaylee for the OVW Women's Championship. The match ended in a double count out.

World Wrestling Entertainment (2019)
Brooks appeared as herself on the January 23, 2019 edition of WWE's NXT TV show, teaming with the villainous Amber Nova in a tag team loss to Kairi Sane and Io Shirai.

All Elite Wrestling (2019–present)
In August 2019, Wrestling Observer Newsletter reported that All Elite Wrestling (AEW) had hired Brooks for a backstage role: hair & makeup stylist for its women wrestlers. However, on the April 29, 2020 episode of AEW Dynamite (AEW's flagship TV show), Brooks appeared onscreen as Rebel, but her character had changed: now, she was the (storyline) exclusive makeup artist—and sycophantic personal assistant—to the narcissistic, delusively grandiose villain Dr. Britt Baker, D.M.D., who kept incorrectly calling her "Reba". Brooks also had two matches (as an enhancement talent) against Big Swole—both quick losses.https://www.cagematch.net//?id=1&nr=283429   Brooks' intentionally ironic, comedic character work as the edgy and cocky Baker's approval-thirsty, personal cheerleader/sidekick became a recurring character on AEW broadcasts. Brooks accomplished all of this while almost never speaking on camera. On 30 June 2021 Rebel suffered a dislocated knee cap injury in a match facing Nyla Rose and Vickie Guerrero.

Other media

Brooks was cast as the lead "badonkadonk" girl in Trace Adkins’ Honky Tonk Badonkadonk music video. Brooks also performed as a backup dancer in Adkins' live performances of the song at the CMT Music Awards and Academy of Country Music Awards (ACMA) shows. Brooks appeared in another country music video, for Brooks and Dunn's song, Play Something Country. Brooks was cast as one of the "homewrecker"s (female dancers performing in between sketches) on Jeff Foxworthy's Foxworthy's Big Night Out TV show. In 2002, Brooks made her acting debut in the short film Sweet Friggin' Daisies. Tanea also appeared in the reality television series Full Throttle Saloon, making guest-starring appearances spanning 3 seasons. Brooks played "Teresa Tomkins" in the 2010 short film Hello. In 2011, Brooks appeared in the "Mufasa and Tucker" episode of Dog Whisperer with Cesar Millan.

Championships and accomplishments
 Ohio Valley WrestlingOVW Women's Championship (1 time)Pro Wrestling Illustrated
PWI ranked her No. 49 of the best 50 female singles wrestlers in the PWI Female 50 in 2017
River City Wrestling
RCW Women's Championship (1 time)
Tried-N-True Pro Wrestling
Tried-N-True Women's Championship (1 time)
Wrestling Observer Newsletter
Worst Match of the Year (2016) vs. Shelly Martinez at Knockouts Knockdown 2016

References

External links

1978 births
Actresses from Oklahoma
All Elite Wrestling personnel
American dancers
American female dancers
American female models
American female professional wrestlers
American film actresses
American hip hop dancers
American make-up artists
American television actresses
Expatriate professional wrestlers in Japan
Legends Football League players
Living people
People from Owasso, Oklahoma
Professional wrestling managers and valets
Professional wrestlers from Oklahoma
Sportspeople from Oklahoma
21st-century American women
University of Tulsa alumni
American cheerleaders
National Football League cheerleaders
21st-century professional wrestlers
OVW Women's Champions